The 97th Pennsylvania House of Representatives District is located in Lancaster County. Steven Mentzer has represented the 97th district in the Pennsylvania House of Representatives since 2013.

District Profile 
District 97 includes the following areas:
 Lititz
 Manheim Township (PART, Districts 01, 02, 03, 04, 05, 06, 08, 09, 10, 11, 12, 13, 14, 15, 16, 17, 18, 19, 20, 21, 22, and 23)
 Warwick Township

Warwick Township has two bridges named to the National Register of Historic Places: The Buck Hill Farm Covered Bridge, and Zook's Mill Covered Bridge.

The 97th District is home to the town of Lititz; a small town voted "American's coolest town" in 2013.

U.S. Open Champion Jim Furyk won a Pennsylvania State Golf Championship while attending Maheim Township High School.

Representatives

Recent election results

References

External links 

https://www2.census.gov/geo/maps/dc10map/SLD_RefMap/lower/st42_pa/sldl42097/DC10SLDL42097_001.pdf
http://www.redistricting.state.pa.us/CensusDisplay.cfm?Plan=2011-Revised-Final&District=97&DistBody=H

Government of Lancaster County, Pennsylvania
97